The Sharon City School District is a small, urban, public school district serving the city of Sharon, Pennsylvania on the western edge of the state. According to 2000 federal census data, it serves a resident population of 16,328. In 2009, the district residents’ per capita income was $15,913, while the median family income was $34,581. In the Commonwealth, the median family income was $49,501 and the United States median family income was $49,445, in 2010. By 2010, Sharon City School District's population declined to 14,028 people.

In school year 2016–17, the Sharon City School District provided basic educational services to 047 pupils through the employment of 135.18 full-time equivalent teachers.

Sharon City School District currently operates four schools:
Case Avenue Elementary School (grades K-6) built 1923, expanded 1950, renovated 1976 demolished 2011, rebuilt 2013
C.M. Musser Elementary School (grades K-6) built 1958, renovated and expanded 2000
West Hill Elementary School (grades K-6) built 1961, renovated and expanded 2000
Sharon Middle-High School (grades 7–12) built 1969, renovated 2003

Extracurriculars
Sharon City School District offers a wide variety of clubs, activities and an extensive sports program.

Sports
The District funds:

Boys
Baseball - AA
Basketball- AAA
Cross Country - AA
Football - AA
Golf - AA
Soccer - AA
Swimming and Diving - AA
Tennis - AA
Track and Field - AA
Wrestling	- AA

Girls
Basketball - AA
Cross Country - AA
Soccer (Fall) - A
Softball - AA
Swimming and Diving - AA
Girls' Tennis - AA
Track and Field - AA
Volleyball - AA

Middle School Sports:

Boys
Basketball
cross Country
Football
Soccer
Track and Field
Wrestling	

Girls
Basketball
Cross Country
Soccer
Track and Field
Volleyball

References

External links
 

School districts in Mercer County, Pennsylvania
Sharon, Pennsylvania